Continua is the fifth studio album by American electronic musician Nosaj Thing. It was released on October 28, 2022.

Track listing

References

External links
 

2022 albums
Nosaj Thing albums
LuckyMe (record label) albums